Ahsanabad Co-operative Housing Society (ACHS) is one of the neighbourhoods of Gadap Town in Karachi, Sindh, Pakistan. 

There are several ethnic groups in Ahsanabad Co-operative Housing Society (ACHS) including Muhajirs, Sindhis, Punjabis, Kashmiris, Seraikis, Pakhtuns, Balochis, Memons, Bohras,  Ismailis, etc. Over 99% of the population is Muslim. The population of Gadap Town is estimated to be nearly one million. Wide and newly built roads with all facilities i.e. water, gas, electricity, telephone, cable TV and cable net. One of the biggest Mosque of Muslim Deoband "Jamiat Ur Rasheed" is also there. One of the famous place "Duck street" is also there.

References

Neighbourhoods of Karachi
Gadap Town